was a Japanese-American physicist and professor at the University of Chicago. Known for his contributions to the field of theoretical physics, he was awarded half of the Nobel Prize in Physics in 2008 for the discovery in 1960 of the mechanism of spontaneous broken symmetry in subatomic physics, related at first to the strong interaction's chiral symmetry and later to the electroweak interaction and Higgs mechanism. The other half was split equally between Makoto Kobayashi and Toshihide Maskawa "for the discovery of the origin of the broken symmetry which predicts the existence of at least three families of quarks in nature."

Early life and education 
Nambu was born in Tokyo, Japan, in 1921. After graduating from the then Fukui Secondary High School in Fukui City, he enrolled in the Imperial University of Tokyo and studied physics. He received his Bachelor of Science in 1942 and Doctorate of Science in 1952. In 1949 he was appointed to associate professor at Osaka City University and promoted to professorship the next year at the age of 29.

In 1952, he was invited by the Institute for Advanced Study in Princeton, New Jersey, United States, to study. He moved to the University of Chicago in 1954 and was promoted to professor in 1958. From 1974 to 1977 he was also Chairman of the Department of Physics.  He became a United States citizen in 1970.

Career in physics 
 
Nambu proposed the "color charge" of quantum chromodynamics,
having done early work on spontaneous symmetry breaking in particle physics,
and having discovered that the dual resonance model could be explained as a quantum mechanical theory of strings.
He was accounted as one of the founders of string theory.

After more than fifty years as a professor, he was Henry Pratt Judson Distinguished Service Professor emeritus at the University of Chicago's Department of Physics and Enrico Fermi Institute.

The Nambu-Goto action in string theory is named after Nambu and Tetsuo Goto.  Also, massless bosons arising in field theories with spontaneous symmetry breaking are sometimes referred to as Nambu–Goldstone bosons.

Death 
Nambu died on 5 July 2015 at the age of 94 in Osaka due to a heart attack. His funeral and memorial services were held among close relatives.

Recognition 
Nambu won numerous honors and awards including the Dannie Heineman Prize (1970), the J. Robert Oppenheimer Memorial Prize (1977),
Japan's Order of Culture (1978), the U.S.'s National Medal of Science (1982), the Max Planck Medal (1985), the Dirac Prize (1986), the Sakurai Prize (1994), the Wolf Prize in Physics (1994/1995), and the Franklin Institute's Benjamin Franklin Medal (2005).
He was awarded one-half of the 2008 Nobel Prize in Physics "for the discovery of the mechanism of spontaneous broken symmetry in subatomic physics".

See also
 List of Japanese Nobel laureates
 List of Nobel laureates affiliated with the University of Tokyo

References

External links 

 Oral history interview with Yoichiro Nambu on 16 July 2004, American Institute of Physics, Niels Bohr Library & Archives
 Yoichiro Nambu, Department of Physics faculty profile, University of Chicago
 Profile, Scientific American Magazine
  Yoichiro Nambu, Sc.D. Biographical Information
 Nambu's most-cited scientific papers
 Yoichiro Nambu's earliest book for the scientific layman 
 Yoichiro Nambu's previously unpublished material, including an original article on spontaneously broken symmetry
 "A History of Nobel Physicists from Wartime Japan"  Article published in the December 1998 issue of Scientific American, co-authored by Laurie Brown and Yoichiro Nambu
Tribute upon Prof. Nambu passing by former student Dr. Madhusree Mukerjee
Guide to the Yoichiro Nambu Papers 1917-2009 at the University of Chicago Special Collections Research Center
 

1921 births
2015 deaths
American physicists
National Medal of Science laureates
People from Fukui Prefecture
American string theorists
Wolf Prize in Physics laureates
Academic staff of the University of Tokyo
University of Chicago faculty
University of Tokyo alumni
Japanese emigrants to the United States
American academics of Japanese descent
Nobel laureates in Physics
American Nobel laureates
Recipients of the Order of Culture
Members of the United States National Academy of Sciences
Institute for Advanced Study visiting scholars
J. J. Sakurai Prize for Theoretical Particle Physics recipients
Winners of the Max Planck Medal